Bogdan Aurelian Aldea (born 26 April 1981) is a retired Romanian footballer who played as a midfielder and currently he is a fitness coach at CFR Cluj.

Playing career
Bogdan Aldea was born in Târgoviște and began his career at the Romanian club Dinamo București. At the date 12 June 1999 he played the first game in the national league for Dinamo București against Otelul Galati.
He is known, as a football player, for winning the Romanian Cup and the Romanian Championship (Divizia A), in the season 1999-2000, both with Dinamo București.

Fitness coach career
He started in the year 2012 to be a fitness coach. His first contract on this new position was with Dinamo București. 
Bogdan Aldea won in the season 2017-2018 his first championship, as a fitness coach, with CFR Cluj.

Honours

Club
Dinamo București
Divizia A: 1999–00
Cupa României: 1999–00

Petrolul Ploiești
Divizia B: 2002–03

CSM Slatina
Liga III: 2010–11

ACS Buftea
Liga III: 2011–12

External links

1981 births
Living people
Sportspeople from Târgoviște
Romanian footballers
FC Dinamo București players
FCM Câmpina players
FC Petrolul Ploiești players
ASC Oțelul Galați players
FC Unirea Urziceni players
Anagennisi Giannitsa F.C. players
FC Drobeta-Turnu Severin players
FC Politehnica Iași (2010) players
FC Olt Slatina players
LPS HD Clinceni players
Liga I players
Liga II players
Liga III players
Association football forwards